Lisa Raymond and Chanda Rubin were the defending champions, but none competed this year.

Julie Halard and Arantxa Sánchez Vicario won the title by defeating Amy Frazier and Rika Hiraki 6–1, 0–6, 6–1 in the final.

Seeds

Draw

Draw

References

External links
 Official results archive (ITF)
 Official results archive (WTA)

Nichirei International Championships
1994 WTA Tour